In mathematics, a uniformly bounded family of functions is a family of bounded functions that can all be bounded by the same constant. This constant is larger than or equal to the absolute value of any value of any of the functions in the family.

Definition

Real line and complex plane 

Let 
 
We call  uniformly bounded if there exists a real number  such that

Metric space 

In general let  be a metric space with metric , then the set
 

Examples
 Every uniformly convergent sequence of bounded functions is uniformly bounded.
 The family of functions  defined for real   with  traveling through the integers, is uniformly bounded by 1.
 The family of derivatives of the above family,  is not uniformly bounded. Each  is bounded by  but there is no real number  such that  for all integers

References

Mathematical analysis